GPSA may stand for:

Georgia Political Science Association, Professional association for political scientists in Georgia, USA
Green Party of South Africa
 GPSA Journal
 Gas Processors Suppliers Association